Sphingomonas indica  is a Gram-negative, rod-shaped and non-motile bacteria from the genus of Sphingomonas which has been isolated from hexachlorocyclohexane soil from a dump site in Ummari near Lucknow in Uttar Pradesh in India.

References

Further reading

External links
Type strain of Sphingomonas indica at BacDive -  the Bacterial Diversity Metadatabase

indica
Bacteria described in 2012